Saint-Aaron is a village in the commune of Lamballe, in Brittany, a region of France. Having originally be settled by the Celtic Bretons, it is named after the Celtic Saint Aaron of Aleth, who was born somewhere in Wales or perhaps Brittany. Saint-Aaron is 5 km northeast of Lamballe town centre, and 20 km east of Saint-Brieuc.

Villages in Brittany